Inter Miami Club de Fútbol II, commonly known as Inter Miami CF II, is an American professional soccer club based in Fort Lauderdale, Florida, that plays in the MLS Next Pro, the third-tier of American soccer. The club was established on February 1, 2020 as Fort Lauderdale CF, before changing to their current name in 2022 and is the reserve team of Major League Soccer club Inter Miami CF.

History
 
On October 9, 2019, it was announced by Inter Miami of Major League Soccer, that they would be fielding a reserve side in USL League One in 2020. A few months later, on February 1, 2020, the club announced the team's name as Fort Lauderdale CF and that they would be playing at the main team's temporary Inter Miami CF Stadium.

The club announced on December 6, 2021, that it was joining the inaugural 21-team MLS Next Pro season starting in 2022. They changed their name to Inter Miami CF II.

Stadium

DRV PNK Stadium is a soccer stadium in Fort Lauderdale, Florida built on the site of the former Lockhart Stadium. The new 19,000-seat stadium and training facility serves as the team headquarters and training ground for Inter Miami CF, its youth academy, and Inter Miami CF II. The stadium will house the team as well as the first team for the first two seasons while the Miami Freedom Park stadium is under construction.

Players and staff

Current squad

Out on loan

Coaching staff

Head coaches record

Statistics and records

Season-by-season

Team records

See also
 Inter Miami CF
 USL League One
 Fort Lauderdale Strikers

References

External links
 

 
Inter Miami CF
Soccer clubs in Florida
Association football clubs established in 2019
2019 establishments in Florida
Former USL League One teams
MLS Next Pro teams
Reserve soccer teams in the United States